Clifford B. Hicks (August 10, 1920 – September 29, 2010) was an American writer and magazine editor, best known for his children's books chronicling the adventures of Alvin Fernald.

Biography
Hicks was born in Marshalltown, Iowa in 1920. He graduated cum laude from Northwestern University, then served as a U.S. Marine during World War II, earning the Silver Star.  In 1945, he joined the staff of Popular Mechanics magazine, and became a special projects editor in 1963. He wrote the magazine's Do-It-Yourself Materials Guide and edited the Do-It-Yourself Encyclopedia.

In 1959, Hicks penned his first children's book, First Boy on the Moon, which was dubbed Best Juvenile Book of the Year by the Friends of American Writers. The next year, he wrote The Marvelous Inventions of Alvin Fernald, the first of a series of books about a boy who relies on his "Magnificent Brain" to solve problems. The books inspired a pair of two-part Disney television movies: The Whiz Kid and the Mystery at Riverton (1974), and The Whiz Kid and the Carnival Caper (1976).

Hicks wrote one non-fiction children's book, The World Above (1965), which discusses the Earth's atmosphere and the universe beyond. In 1971, he began the Peter Potts series, which follows the misadventures of a small town boy who often gets into trouble "by accident". Hicks also wrote a two-act play, Alvin Fernald, Mayor for a Day (1992), which was based on one of his Alvin Fernald books.

On September 29, 2010, Hicks died at his home in Brevard, North Carolina, at the age of 90.

Children's books authored by Clifford Hicks

Alvin Fernald series
The Marvelous Inventions of Alvin Fernald – 1960 (illustrated by Charles Geer)
Alvin's Secret Code – 1963
Alvin Fernald, Foreign Trader – 1966
Alvin Fernald, Mayor for a Day – 1970
Alvin Fernald, Superweasel – 1974
Alvin's Swap Shop – 1976
Alvin Fernald, TV Anchorman – 1980
The Wacky World of Alvin Fernald – 1981
Alvin Fernald, Master of a Thousand Disguises – 1986
Alvin Fernald's Incredible Buried Treasure – 2009

Peter Potts series
Peter Potts – 1971
Pop and Peter Potts – 1984
Peter Potts Book of World Records – 1987

Other children's books
First Boy on the Moon – 1959
The World Above – 1965

References

External links

The Wacky World of Alvin Fernald (archived 2006)
"Cops on the Campus" by Hicks, Popular Mechanics, July 1948
 

1920 births
2010 deaths
American technology writers
American children's writers
United States Marine Corps personnel of World War II
Recipients of the Silver Star
United States Marines
Northwestern University alumni
People from Marshalltown, Iowa